David B. Sachar is an American gastroenterologist.

Sachar received his undergraduate degree at Harvard College and earned his medical degree from Harvard Medical School. He teaches at Mount Sinai School of Medicine, where he was the first Dr. Burrill B. Crohn Professor of Medicine from 1992 to 1999.

Sachar was honored with a 2019 Golden Goose Award for his contributions to Oral Rehydration Therapy for the treatment of cholera.

References

Living people
American gastroenterologists
Harvard University alumni
Harvard Medical School alumni
Icahn School of Medicine at Mount Sinai faculty
American people of Lithuanian-Jewish descent
Jewish American scientists
Year of birth missing (living people)
21st-century American Jews